Morten Lindberg may refer to:
 Master Fatman (Morten Mabunda Lindberg), Danish media personality and creative
 Morten Lindberg (sound engineer), Norwegian sound engineer and music producer